Maryam Irandoost (Persian: مریم ایراندوست; born February 3, 1979) is an Iranian former professional football player and manager. Before she became head coach of national team, she was head coach of Malavan and Iran women's national under-16 football team. She played for Pegah Gilan and Malavan.
She is the daughter of current Malavan head coach, Nosrat Irandoost.

References

1965 births
Living people
Iranian women's footballers
Women's national association football team managers
Female association football managers
Iran women's international footballers
Women's association footballers not categorized by position
Iranian football managers
People from Bandar-e Anzali
Sportspeople from Gilan province
21st-century Iranian women